Shargaljuut  is an urban-type settlement geographically located in the Erdenetsogt sum (district) of Bayankhongor Province in southern Mongolia. Officially Shargaljuut is a bag (commune) under Bayankhongor city jurisdiction, but situated 54 km NE from the city on Shargaljuut river in Khangai Mountains at 2136 m elevation.

Shargaljuut population is 1,444 (est.end of 2006) and is the second largest settlement of Bayankhongor Province after Bayankhongor city  proper.

Shargaljuut is a resort with a number of hot (up to +95°C) mineral springs, some of them with sulfur mud.

References 

Populated places in Mongolia